WJDX may refer to:

 WJDX (AM), a radio station (620 AM) licensed to Jackson, Mississippi, United States
 WJDX-FM, a radio station (105.1 FM) licensed to Kosciusko, Mississippi